Erol Mutlu (born 1 March 1952) is a Turkish wrestler. He competed in the men's Greco-Roman 68 kg at the 1976 Summer Olympics.

References

External links
 

1952 births
Living people
Turkish male sport wrestlers
Olympic wrestlers of Turkey
Wrestlers at the 1976 Summer Olympics
Place of birth missing (living people)